Smithton is a town on the far north-west coast of Tasmania, Australia. It lies on the Bass Highway, 85 km north-west of Burnie. Smithton is the administrative centre of the Circular Head Council.

History
Duck River Post Office opened on 1 November 1873 and was renamed Smithton in 1895. In 1905 Smithton was declared a town and the Mowbray swamp (now part of the locality of Mella) was drained for dairy pasture. It was here that, in 1920, the 45,000 year old skeleton of a Zygomaturus (marsupial hippopotamus) was discovered.

In 1905, the Jetty at Smithton was 1200m long.

The first regular rail service on the Marrawah Tramway started in 1913. In 1919 The Stanley–Trowutta railway commenced services and by 1921 the Smithton to Irishtown link was opened. By 1922 the railway link from Myalla to Wiltshire Junction was completed, thus joining the railways in the municipality to the State system. Smithton High School was opened in 1937 and in 1951 a Kindergarten and Public Hospital were opened in Smithton, and the town began to flourish.

Economy
The economy of Smithton is agriculture based, consisting primarily of dairy and beef farming. Other major industries that contribute to the local economy are fishing, aquaculture, crop farming, timber plantations and tourism.

As a major centre in the northwest of the state, several companies have established processing plants in Smithton. Major employers in the town include Greenham Tasmania, who operate a meat processing plant that prepares beef for export to Japan and the United States as well as Australian markets. The plant employs over 120 staff. McCain Foods (Australia) Pty Ltd maintain potato storage, processing and freezing facilities in the town for the production of French fries. The McCain plant operates year-round and employs a workforce of 150 from the local community. Two timber mills are also located in Smithton, operated by Britton Bros and Ta Ann Tasmania. Tasmanian Seafoods Pty Ltd operate an abalone processing facility and cannery as well as having their head office located in the town. Also, Murray Goulburn (Dairy Company) have offices there.

Tarkine Fresh Oysters (Bolduans Bay Oysters P/L) also run a significant aquaculture facility in Smithton, employing more than 40 people.

Infrastructure
The education community consists of a Catholic Independent, a Christian School and Government schools. St Peter Chanel is the local Catholic Primary school servicing the community. Circular Head Christian School (CHCS) is the local Christian School, which starts at Kindergarten and goes right through to year 12.

The National Broadband Network ran a trial rollout in Smithton, with the first customers connected in July 2010.

In 1996, a Cultural Heritage Centre and Museum was started in Smithton to preserve many of the artifacts from Smithton's settlement and is still run today by local volunteers. It houses a collection of photos, tools and other day to day memorabilia used in the Circular Head area.

Climate
Smithton has a Mediterranean climate (Köppen Csb), with January and February's rainfall data bordering an oceanic climate (Köppen Cfb). The record highest temperature was 36.6 °C on 30 January 2009, while the record low was -3.9 °C on 20 June 2015.

Notable people
Noted former Smithtonians include:
 Hannah Gadsby (born in Smithton, 1978), comedian, winner of the Edinburgh Comedy Awards in 2017
 Enid Lyons (born in Smithton, 1897), first woman elected to the Australian House of Representatives
 Don Kay (born in Smithton, 1933), composer and professor of music

See also
 Smithton Airport

References

Localities of Circular Head Council
Towns in Tasmania